Thymelicus leonina is a small butterfly found in the East Palearctic ( China, Amur, Ussuri, Japan) that belongs to the skippers family.

Description from Seitz

Male with stigma. Wings above light reddish yellow, all the veins striped with black; border of hindwing broader. On the underside all the veins are heavily black (87 f). Amur and Japan.

See also
List of butterflies of Russia

References

Hesperiinae